Thyrocopa vagans is a moth of the family Xyloryctidae. It was first described by Lord Walsingham in 1907. It is endemic to the Hawaiian island of Kauai.

The length of the forewings is about 8 mm. Adults are on wing at least in May, August, and September. The ground color of the forewings is mostly very light gray, mottled with a few brown scales, darker near thorax and along the costal margin. The hindwings are light brown. The fringe is very light brown.

External links

Thyrocopa
Endemic moths of Hawaii
Moths described in 1907